Razdolnoye is a rural locality (a selo) and the administrative center of Romankautsky Selsoviet of Mazanovsky District, Amur Oblast, Russia. The population was 150 as of 2018. There are 10 streets.

Geography 
Razdolnoye is located on the right bank of the Kamenushka River, 23 km southeast of Novokiyevsky Uval (the district's administrative centre) by road. Romankautsy is the nearest rural locality.

References 

Rural localities in Mazanovsky District